Gulella puzeyi is a species of very small air-breathing land snail, a terrestrial pulmonate gastropod mollusk in the family Streptaxidae.

This species is endemic to South Africa. Its natural habitat is subtropical or tropical dry forests. It is threatened by habitat loss.

References

Puzeyi
Gastropods described in 1939
Endemic fauna of South Africa
Taxonomy articles created by Polbot